Shucheng County is a county in the west-central part of Anhui Province, People's Republic of China. It is located in the southeastern corner of the prefecture-level city of Lu'an and is its easternmost county-level division. The government of Shucheng County is located in Chengguan Town.

Shucheng County has jurisdiction over 21 towns and townships,1 resort center and 1 economic development district.

Administrative divisions
In the present, Shucheng County has 15 towns and 6 townships.
15 Towns

6 Townships

Climate

References

County-level divisions of Anhui
Lu'an